The Riddle: Woman is a 1920 American silent drama film directed by Edward José, distributed by Pathé Exchange, and starring opera singer Geraldine Farrar in her last film. This film was also the film debut of Madge Bellamy.

Plot
As described in a film magazine, Lilla Gravert (Farrar) falls under the spell of the Eric Helsingor (Carleton), a captain of chance, only to be deceived by the rogue. She attempts suicide but is saved by Larz Olrik (Love) who, by the customs of his country, is engaged to Kristine (Blood). Larz induces Lilla to accept the invitation of Isaac Meyer (Stern), a friend of Lilla's late father, to come to America. There she and Larz are married. Larz is trustee of Kristine's estate and finds that much of her money is disappearing. Kristine has also become a victim of Helsingor's and is being blackmailed. Helsingor turns his attention to Marie Meyer (Bellamy), Isaac's motherless daughter, for his usual sinister purposes. Lilla insists that he must not carry out his plans. He offers to give her incriminating letters if she will not stand in his way. Lilla turns on him and is so glorious in her rage that Helsingor tells her that it is she that he wants. She is struggling with him when Kristine kills Helsingor and then commits suicide, removing Lilla and Marie's menace.

Cast
Geraldine Farrar as Lilla Gravert
Montagu Love as Larz Olrik
Adele Blood as Kristine
William P. Carleton as Eric Helsingor
Frank Losee as Sigurd Gravert
Madge Bellamy as Marie Meyer
Louis Stern as Isaac Meyer
Philippe De Lacy

Production
The production was filmed on location at Marblehead, Massachusetts and at the former Thanhouser Company studio in New Rochelle, New York.

Preservation status
It is not known whether the film currently survives.

References

External links

The Riddle: Woman at AllMovie
Still taken on set (University of Washington/Sayre Collection)

1920 films
American silent feature films
Films directed by Edward José
American films based on plays
1920 drama films
Silent American drama films
American black-and-white films
Pathé Exchange films
Associated Exhibitors films
1920s American films